The coronal plane (also known as the frontal plane) is an anatomical plane that divides the body into dorsal and ventral sections. It is perpendicular to the sagittal and transverse planes.

Details
The coronal plane is an example of a longitudinal plane. For a human, the mid-coronal plane would transect a standing body into two halves (front and back, or anterior and posterior) in an imaginary line that cuts through both shoulders. The description of the coronal plane applies to most animals as well as humans even though humans walk upright and the various planes are usually shown in the vertical orientation.

The sternal plane (planum sternale) is a coronal plane which transects the front of the sternum.

Etymology
The term is derived from Latin corona ('garland, crown'), from Ancient Greek κορώνη (korōnē, 'garland, wreath'). The coronal plane is so called because it lies in the direction of Coronal suture.

Additional images

See also

 Anatomical terms of location
 Sagittal plane
 Transverse plane

References

External links
 

Anatomical planes